Naimul Islam (born 3 September 2000) is a Bangladeshi cricketer. He made his Twenty20 debut for Uttara Sporting Club in the 2018–19 Dhaka Premier Division Twenty20 Cricket League on 26 February 2019. He made his List A debut for Uttara Sporting Club in the 2018–19 Dhaka Premier Division Cricket League on 23 March 2019.

References

External links
 

2000 births
Living people
Bangladeshi cricketers
Uttara Sporting Club cricketers
Place of birth missing (living people)